Rani Lakshmi Bai Central Agricultural University is central agricultural university located in Jhansi district of Uttar Pradesh. The university was established by the government of India through the Rani Lakshmi Bai Central Agricultural University Act - 2014, passed by parliament in 2014. 

Prof. Arvind Kumar, a globally renowned rapeseed-mustard scientist, educator, and institution builder is credited with establishing this Agricultural Institution of National Importance in 2014 as Founder Vice- Chancellor. He is immensely recognized for promoting farm literacy, establishing partnerships between farmers and researchers, and dedicating his life to science and society, bringing key reforms in agricultural research, education and development. In 2023, he was conferred the Padam Shri by the Government of India for his contributions to science and engineering. During his 8-yrs tenure at RLBCAU, Jhansi the university acquired 300 acres land and built state-of-the-art, eco-friendly academic, administrative, and world-class amenities for the Colleges of Agriculture, Horticulture, and Forestry, which were inaugurated by Hon'ble PM Shri Narendra Modi Ji on August 29, 2020. 

The vision of RLBCAU is to establish itself as a centre of excellence with social commitment by integrating modern, scientific and technological knowledge and skills with the basic human ethos and values. The University shall set forth a model in teaching, research and personality development and create skilled human resource with a sense of responsiveness towards society, the country and the world at large. The first academic session of university was started from July 2014. The university follows a semester system with two semesters every year. RLBCAU offering several UG, PG and Ph.D programmes in various subjects for which admission is made through  ICAR AIEEA conducted by NTA.

History
RLBCAU history starts with a memorandum submitted to the Prime Minister on 27 July 2009 by a delegation of MPs and MLAs, requesting the establishment of a central agricultural university in the Bundelkhand region.

The first bill for the establishment of the university was introduced in the Rajya Sabha on 28 December 2011. After clarifications, a reintroduction, a report by a committee and a response of the Department of Agricultural Research, "Rani Lakshmi Bai Central Agricultural University Act" was passed by both the houses and published on 5 March 2014.

Campus
The campus of the university is nearby to Indian Grassland and Fodder Research Institute, Jhansi, and the building of the main campus is inaugurated by the Prime Minister of India.

Academics
University has started the Bachelor of Science (Hon.) in agriculture from session 2014–2015.

References

External links
 Official Website of Rani Lakshmi Bai Central Agricultural University

Central universities in Uttar Pradesh
Agricultural universities and colleges in Uttar Pradesh
Jhansi district
Educational institutions established in 2014
2014 establishments in Uttar Pradesh